USS Prudent (PG–96), originally ordered as HMS Privet, was an  patrol gunboat in the United States Navy.

Prudent was laid down by the Morton Engine and Dry Dock Company, Ltd., in Montreal, Quebec, on 14 August 1942; launched on 4 December 1942, sponsored by Mrs. Vincent Godfrey; delivered to the U.S. Navy on 14 August 1943; and commissioned on 16 August 1943.

Service history
Following shakedown off Bermuda, Prudent steamed to New York to begin a series of east coast-Cuba escort runs.  Sailing with her first convoy on 7 December 1943, she completed her 11th run, at New York, on 21 December 1944.  During January and into February 1945, she patrolled the sea lanes off the New England coast, then on 20 February, departed New York on her last escort assignment to Guantanamo Bay. Returning to New York on 15 March, she resumed patrol duties, and for the remainder of World War II in Europe plied the waters off the northeast coast.

Ordered inactivated at the end of the war, Prudent sailed south on 11 June, to Norfolk, Virginia, thence to Charleston, South Carolina, where she was decommissioned on 11 October 1945.  Struck from the Navy List on 1 November 1945, she was transferred to the Maritime Commission for disposal on 22 September 1947.

In 1949 the ship was acquired by the Italian Navy and renamed Elbano.  In 1951 she was converted to a hydrographic survey vessel and renamed a fourth time, Staffetta.  She continued to serve the Italian Navy under that name until she was discarded in 1970.

References

External links 
 
 hazegray.org: USS Prudent

 

World War II patrol vessels of the United States
Ships built in Quebec
1942 ships
Prudent